Laurel is a town in Laurel Township, Franklin County, Indiana, United States. The population was 512 at the 2010 census.

History
Laurel was platted in 1836 by James Conwell, a native of Maryland. Conwell had first intended to name his settlement New Baltimore, but instead decided to call it Laurel, after the city of Laurel, Maryland. The last wild passenger pigeon, once the most common bird in North America, was shot near Laurel in 1902.

The Laurel post office was established in 1837.

Geography
Laurel is located at  (39.500936, -85.186895).

Demographics

2010 census
As of the census of 2010, there were 512 people, 196 households, and 134 families living in the town. The racial makeup of the town was 98.4% White, 0.2% African American, 0.6% Native American, 0.2% from other races, and 0.6% from two or more races. Hispanic or Latino of any race were 2.5% of the population.

There were 196 households, of which 38.3% had children under the age of 18 living with them, 39.3% were married couples living together, 18.9% had a female householder with no husband present, 10.2% had a male householder with no wife present, and 31.6% were non-families. 23.0% of all households were made up of individuals, and 10.7% had someone living alone who was 65 years of age or older. The average household size was 2.61 and the average family size was 3.08.

The median age in the town was 34.8 years. 27% of residents were under the age of 18; 10.4% were between the ages of 18 and 24; 27.9% were from 25 to 44; 21% were from 45 to 64; and 13.7% were 65 years of age or older. The gender makeup of the town was 51.0% male and 49.0% female.

2000 census
As of the census of 2000, there were 579 people, 201 households, and 155 families living in the town. The racial makeup of the town was 98.96% White, 0.17% from other races, and 0.86% from two or more races. Hispanic or Latino of any race were 1.21% of the population.

There were 201 households, out of which 41.3% had children under the age of 18 living with them, 55.7% were married couples living together, 13.4% had a female householder with no husband present, and 22.4% were non-families. 17.9% of all households were made up of individuals, and 8.0% had someone living alone who was 65 years of age or older. The average household size was 2.88 and the average family size was 3.21.

In the town, the population was spread out, with 31.4% under the age of 18, 10.4% from 18 to 24, 29.5% from 25 to 44, 18.1% from 45 to 64, and 10.5% who were 65 years of age or older. The median age was 30 years. For every 100 females there were 104.6 males. For every 100 females age 18 and over, there were 96.5 males.

The median income for a household in the town was $29,375, and the median income for a family was $33,625. Males had a median income of $28,846 versus $20,625 for females. The per capita income for the town was $12,035. About 11.6% of families and 13.6% of the population were below the poverty line, including 11.5% of those under age 18 and 22.8% of those age 65 or over.

Education
Laurel has a public library, a branch of the Franklin County Public Library District.

Notable people
James Emmert, Indiana Attorney General and Justice of the Indiana Supreme Court

See also
 Whitewater Canal

References

Towns in Franklin County, Indiana